Zaravand was a region of the old Armenia  300–800, in the area of Khoy (present-day Iran), it is also the name of a modern-day city in Iran.

Early medieval Armenian regions
History of West Azerbaijan Province